Dyslalia means difficulties in talking due to structural defects in speech organs, such as sigmatism (defective pronunciation of sibilant sounds, for example "S" pronounced as "TH") and rhotacism, in which the letter "R" pronounced as "I or Y". It does not include speech impairment due to neurological or other factors.

See also 
 Alalia
 Lists of language disorders
 Speech sound disorder

References

External links 
 http://www.britannica.com/EBchecked/topic/175282/dyslalia

Speech and language pathology

scn:Checca